West Clarksville is a hamlet in Allegany County, New York, United States. West Clarksville has a post office with ZIP code 14786.

References

Hamlets in Allegany County, New York
Hamlets in New York (state)